Frimaire was the third month in the French Republican Calendar. The month was named after the French word frimas, which means frost.

Frimaire was the third month of the autumn quarter (mois d'automne). It started between 21 November and 23 November. It ended between 20 December and 22 December. It follows the Brumaire and precedes the Nivôse.

Day name table 

Like all FRC months, Frimaire lasted 30 days and was divided into three 10-day weeks called décades (decades). Every day had the name of an agricultural plant, except the 5th (Quintidi) and 10th day (Decadi) of every decade, which had the name of a domestic animal (Quintidi) or an agricultural tool (Decadi).

Other exceptions are the 8th day (Honey) and the 11th day (Wax). The original proposal of Fabre d'Églantine was Epicéa (Spruce) for the 8th and Thuya (White Cedar) for the 11th, but the National Convention shifted Honey and Wax from Nivôse to Frimaire thus foiling the original intention.

Conversion table

External links 
 Autumn Quarter of Year II (facsimile)

French Republican calendar
November
December

sv:Franska revolutionskalendern#Månaderna